The Takeover is a 1995 action film directed by Troy Cook and starring Billy Drago and Nick Mancuso as rival drug lords.  David Amos and Gene Mitchell play good-guys who try to intervene in the turf war.

Cast
 Billy Drago as Daniel Stein
 John Savage as Greg
 Nick Mancuso as Anthony Vilachi
 Eric Da Re as Venokur
 Cali Timmins as Kathy
 David Amos as Jonathan Fitzsimmons
 Gene Mitchell as Mickey Lane
 Tony Longo as Waldo
 Anita Barone as Cindy Lane
 Manu Tupou as Manu
 Greg Lewis as Vic
 Sam Scarber as D.E. Moore
 James A. Donzell as Steins Associate
 Arlene Rodriguez as Brandi

Subsequent arrest and convictions

In 2000 co-producer Michael Woods and co-star David Amos would be arrested for the 1989 murder of Horace McKenna.  McKenna was a partner of Woods in two strip clubs in Los Angeles, The Bare Elegance and The New Jet Strip.  After the film was made the detectives started to question associates of the two when it was realized that much of the plot of the film was based around the murder of McKenna.

During the 2001 trial Amos would give testimony against Woods in exchange for a lighter sentence.

References

External links 
 

1996 films
1990s action films
American independent films
1995 independent films
1990s English-language films
1990s American films